Huo Yuanjia is a 2001 Chinese television series loosely based on the life of the Chinese martial artist Huo Yuanjia. It includes a subplot about Chen Zhen, a fictional apprentice of Huo Yuanjia and the protagonist of the 1972 film Fist of Fury. The series was directed by Jia Yun and starred Vincent Zhao, Wu Yue, Mei Ting, Qi Yan, and He Yin in the lead roles. A sequel, Jingwu Yingxiong Chen Zhen, was released later in the same year.

Plot 
During the late Qing dynasty, China has suffered humiliating defeats in battles against foreign powers such as Britain and Japan and has been forced to sign unequal treaties and cede territories. In Tianjin, even though Chinese martial artist Huo Endi defeats his Japanese opponent in a lei tai match, his triumph is insignificant as China has just lost to Japan in the First Sino-Japanese War, with Chinese naval fleet completely destroyed.

Huo Yuanjia, Huo Endi's son, travels to Beijing to meet his father's friend, "Great Sword" Wang Wu, and unwittingly gets involved in the politics of the Hundred Days' Reform. Wang Wu attempts to rescue the "Six Gentlemen" who lead the reformists after they have been imprisoned on Empress Dowager Cixi's order. Huo Yuanjia joins Wang Wu in his quest but they fail and the six men are publicly executed, while Wang Wu dies a gruesome death later when he tries to avenge them. Through his experiences, Huo Yuanjia realises that China needs to change in order to survive in the future. Later, he meets members of the Tongmenghui, a secret society planning to overthrow the imperial government and establish a republic in China, and supports them in their covert activities.

Huo Yuanjia travels to Shanghai, where he establishes the Jingwu School to train Chinese martial artists to defend China from foreign intrusion and boost national morale. He makes his name after defeating a Russian wrestler in Tianjin and a British boxer in Shanghai. At the same time, he meets the hostile Chen Zhen, who seeks vengeance on him. Chen Zhen's father had died in a fight against Huo Endi years ago and since Huo Endi is already dead, Chen Zhen turns on Huo Yuanjia to settle the feud. In an attempt to make peace, Huo Yuanjia accepts Chen Zhen as an apprentice and trains him in martial arts.

Huo Yuanjia's love relationships are in a mess because he is in love with Qiyun and Nong Jingqiu, who stand on opposing sides: Qiyun is the daughter of Prince Rong, a Manchu noble tasked by the imperial government to destroy the Tongmenghui; Nong Jingqiu is the sister of Nong Jinsun, a Tongmenghui member and co-founder of the Jingwu School. Besides that, Huo Yuanjia faces love rivals: Watanabe Ichiro, a Japanese consul, is in love with Qiyun; Zheng Yefeng, Nong Jingqiu's godbrother, has a crush on his godsister.

Cast
 Vincent Zhao as Huo Yuanjia
 Wu Yue as Chen Zhen
 Mei Ting as Nong Jingqiu
 Qi Yan as Princess Qiyun
 Ma Kui as Nong Jinsun
 Huang Huiyi as Zhao Qiannan
 He Yin as Wang Xiang'er
 Feng Jingao as Hu Zishi
 Yue Yueli as Prince Rong
 Su Ke as Zheng Yefeng
 Chen Kai as Liu Zhensheng
 Lu Xingyu as Watanabe Ichiro (Dubian Yilang)
 Feng Peng as Zhou Tiezhu
 Xie Yunshan as Tietou
 Shu Chang as Ju'er
 Qin Jiahua as Ōhashi (Daqiao)
 Li Zhenqi as Wang Wu
 Liu Haijun as Huang Tianba
 Yangzi as Chu Chu

External links 
 

Martial arts television series
2001 Chinese television series debuts
Television series set in the Qing dynasty
Mandarin-language television shows
Chinese action television series